Mieussy is a commune in the Haute-Savoie department in the Auvergne-Rhône-Alpes region of France. It is a traditional Alpine farming village in the Vallée du Giffre, around 35 kilometers east of Geneva. The area is known for its scenic views, skiing, and local foods. It is host to the "Foire d' Automne", a harvest festival which runs for two days in October.

Winter skiing 

This is integrated over and around the surrounding mountains to the neighboring ski resort of Praz de Lys.

Sommand is noted for its varied landscape of forests and open panoramic views. It has almost none of the over development and mass tourism infrastructure characterised by many nearby resorts. This is due to the area being a protected nature reserve which allows only low impact sustainable development. Its focus is on providing a family friendly resort while leaving other resorts, like Les Gets, Morzine and Flaine to cater for the Northern European "package holiday" and "youth" market.

Sommand is the closest major ski resort to Geneva. It is a 25-minute drive to the end of the valley and the start of Geneva district. Its high altitude starting point and the Mont Blanc area micro-climate gives it better snow quality and quantity that many other resorts. The U23 World Championship Cross Country Skiing was held here in 2008.

Summer 

Mieussy has one of the largest commune areas with many traditional chalet farm hamlets. These small rural farms continue the  traditions with the passing of century, making a range of savoyard products, including reblochon. The Fruitiere in the village sells locally made farm produce, including reblochon.

In the summer, maps of the surrounding hiking trails lead through meadows and forests up into the mountains and are available from the Mieussy tourist office.

Each year the village is host to the traditional farmers harvest market, Mieussy "Foire d' Automne", when thousands spill into its streets to buy sweet chestnuts, fresh pressed apple juice, Savoyard meats and cheeses in a general celebration of the harvest. The festival runs for two days in October and is the largest authentic farmers festival in the region.

Paragliding 

Mieussy became known as the birthplace of paragliding when in June 1978 three friends, Jean-Claude Bétemps, André Bohn, and Gérard Bosson, were inspired by an article on ‘slope soaring’ in the Parachute Manual magazine. They calculated that on a suitable slope, a  square parachute could be inflated by running down a slope; Bétemps launched from Pointe du Pertuiset, Mieussy, and flew .

A paragliding school and introductory tandem flights are offered by the Mieussy football pitch.

See also
 

Communes of the Haute-Savoie department
 

 Praz de Lys-Sommand

References
 

 

 

 
		

 
		 −	
Communes of Haute-Savoie